The following is a sortable table of all songs by Mayday Parade:

The column Song list the song title.
The column Writer(s) lists who wrote the song.
The column Album lists the album the song is featured on.
The column Producer lists the producer of the song.
The column Year lists the year in which the song was released.
The column Length list the length/duration of the song.

Studio recordings

References
 Footnotes
Acoustic version included on 2008 reissue of A Lesson in Romantics (2007)
Included as a bonus track on 2008 reissue of A Lesson in Romantics (2007)
Bonus tracks on iTunes Deluxe Edition of Anywhere but Here (2009)
Bonus tracks on iTunes Deluxe Edition of Mayday Parade (2011)
Bonus track on 2014 reissue of Monsters in the Closet (2013)

 Citations

Mayday Parade